Nuran Pelikyan (born 12 December 1967) is a Bulgarian wrestler. He competed in the men's Greco-Roman 48 kg at the 1992 Summer Olympics.

References

External links
 

1967 births
Living people
Bulgarian male sport wrestlers
Olympic wrestlers of Bulgaria
Wrestlers at the 1992 Summer Olympics
Sportspeople from Plovdiv